Merry Christmas Mr. Mo is a 2016 South Korean comedy drama film. Shot in black and white, it was written and directed by first-time director Lim Dae-hyung and stars Gi Ju-bong, Oh Jung-hwan, Go Won-hee and Jeon Yeo-been.

Plot
Widower and barber Mo Geum-san (Gi Ju-bong) is terminally ill. His dying wish is to make a short film directed by his estranged son, Stephen (Oh Jung-hwan).

Cast
 Gi Ju-bong as Mo Geum-san
 Oh Jung-hwan as Stephen
 Go Won-hee as Ye-won
 Jeon Yeo-been as Ja-yeong
 Kim Hak-sun as Yong-ho
 Kim Jung-young as Yeon-jeong

Awards and nominations

References

External links
 
 
 

2016 films
2010s Korean-language films
2016 comedy-drama films
South Korean comedy-drama films
2010s South Korean films